Perry County is a county located in the southeastern portion of the U.S. state of Missouri. As of the 2020 census, the population was 18,956. Its county seat is Perryville. The county was officially organized on November 16, 1820 (effective January 1, 1821) from Ste. Genevieve County and was named after Oliver Hazard Perry, a naval hero of the War of 1812.

History

Early Native Americans
The first inhabitants of what is now Perry County were Mississippian Mound Builders who cultivated corn and constructed earthen mounds.  The Mississippian cultures inhabited the region until their decline in the 12th and 13th centuries.  Remnants of their earthen mounds can be found in the eastern part of the county.  By the time of European contact, the area was populated by Native Americans of the Illinois Confederation who inhabited much of eastern Missouri.

French and Spanish rule
During the 18th Century, the Perry County area, like the rest of the future State of Missouri, was part of French Louisiana, also known as the Illinois Country. For most of the 18th Century the area of present-day Perry County was left largely uninhabited, even by the French of nearby Ste. Genevieve. The latter was the first permanent White settlement in the Missouri area. In 1764, when the terms of the 1763 Treaty of Paris were announced in Louisiana, the French settlers found themselves transferred to an alien domination, that of Spain. In general the French were unhappy with the change of rule and the Spanish governance of the territory was an uneasy one, occasionally punctuated by armed rebellion. In the Ste. Genevieve area, the Spaniards, making a virtue of necessity, tended to let the French govern themselves.  During the 1770s and 1780s members of the Peoria Tribe, whose situation had deteriorated under British and American rule in Illinois, migrated west across the Mississippi River into Ste. Genevieve and the lower part of the Bois Brule Bottoms.

The French population suffered continued harassment by the Osage to the southwest.  In the 1790s, Louis Lorimier, authorized by Spanish officials, invited the Shawnee and Delaware tribes in Ohio to immigrate and settle along Apple Creek in Perry County in the hope that they would act as a buffer between the French to the north and the Osage to the south. Their largest village, Le Grand Village Sauvage - with a population of some 400, was located in the southern part of the county, just above Apple Creek, near present-day Old Appleton. Within a decade of the Native American immigration, Spanish authorities showed an interest in opening the area to colonization by Americans. The first French settlers were Jean Baptiste Barsaloux and his father Girard Barsaloux who lived in the Bois Brule Bottom in 1787.

American settlement
The first American settlers to Perry County arrived during the latter half of the 1790s and claimed rich land in Bois Brule Bottom. These Americans organized the region's original Baptist Church in 1807. In the early 19th century, a second group of American settlers crossed the Mississippi River to take advantage of Spanish land offers. These were Roman Catholics of English stock from north-central Kentucky. They had originally come from Maryland to escape religious discrimination and prided themselves on being descendants of Lord Baltimore's original colonists. The first of these to settle permanently in the future Perry County was Isidore Moore. He arrived in 1801 and became a patriarch of the area, and founded Tucker's Settlement. Others soon followed whose family names predominated the decades: Tucker, Fenwick, Cissell, Hayton, Riney, Hamilton, Layton, Manning, and Hagan. Most of these settled in the uplands around Perryville in a place called the Barrens because of its open land.  Another Maryland Catholic, Joseph Fenwick, established the short-lived Fenwick Settlement at the mouth of Brazeau Creek in the Brazeau Bottoms.

When the region was transferred to American sovereignty in 1803–1804, the Barrens became part of the Louisiana Territory. Prior to the admission of Missouri to statehood in 1821, several new migrations altered the religious composition of the future county. In 1817, a large group of Presbyterians from North Carolina settled in the neighborhood of Brazeau, an area roughly bounded by the Mississippi River and the Cinque Hommes Creek and Apple Creek. These settlers organized a church in 1819. They were soon followed by Methodists from the same state whose family names live on, like Abernathy, Farrar, and Rutledge. In 1826, they built their first log meeting house, which was later replaced by York Chapel.

Until 1821, the Barrens region formed the southern portion of Ste. Genevieve County. When Missouri was granted statehood, Perry County was organized out of the parent district. It was divided into three townships: Brazeau, Cinque Hommes, and Bois Brule. Their boundaries, following natural geographical features, were quite irregular. In 1856, the borders were made symmetrical and two new townships, St. Mary's and Saline, were added.

After 1821, the descendants of French colonial families from Ste. Genevieve trickled into Perry County, and in the middle of the next decade, their ranks swelled by immigrants from France itself. They settled on the lands that were near the present city of Perryville. At about the same time, a small group of Flemings settled in the northeastern part of the county, with the present town of Belgique as their center. There were also Swiss in the same area.

German immigration
The late 1830s saw the beginnings of a heavy German immigration that would permanently alter the ethnic balance of the county. In the fall of 1838, more than 600 Saxon Lutherans, under the leadership of Pastor Martin Stephan, uprooted themselves and migrated to Missouri in what is called The Saxon Lutheran Migration, seeking to avoid the enforced religious conformity brought about by the Prussian Union of churches. They settled in the southeastern corner of the county and moved inland through a series of towns whose names enshrined both religion and nationality: Wittenberg, Friedheim, Frohna, Dresden, Altenburg, and Paitzdorf, which was renamed Uniontown during the American Civil War. Much of the legacy of the German immigration lives on today through the Lutheran Church–Missouri Synod. A distinct Saxon dialect of German continues to be spoken by about 250 residents (in 2014), although that number is declining with the youngest speakers being over 50 years old.

Others who settled in the area were German Catholics, mostly from Bavaria and Baden. They settled in the Barrens area. The Lutherans and Presbyterians established churches in the region bounded by the 1856 Township of Brazeau. The Methodists located farther west in the area that comprised the 1856 township of Cinque Hommes. Then in 1844–1845, they divided between north and south over the question of whether a bishop could own slaves. The two Methodist churches in Perry County parted company, the city congregation going with the North and the York Chapel siding with the South. The Baptists of the county tended to congregate in both Bois Brule Bottom and in the area of Saline Township. In the first decades of the 19th century, they met in private homes.

While it is one of the oldest communities in Missouri, Perry County also founded the first college west of the Mississippi River, dating to 1827.

Geography
Shaped like a camel's hump, Perry County consists of  that fit neatly into a wedge created by the confluence of Apple Creek and the Mississippi River. Topographically, it is divided into lowlands and uplands. The lowlands comprise about one-eighth of the county and lie for the most part along the river. Its rich soil, coupled with its size, makes it the most productive farmland in the county. Smaller in size but still important is the Brazeau Bottom on the Mississippi River below Cape Cinque Hommes and the bottom situated near the mouth of Apple Creek.

The Uplands constitutes the largest part of the county and its topography varies greatly. The best parts of it are in the central area where the soil is generally good and the terrain nearly level or gently rolling. Rolling uplands surround this central section and are bounded by the Saline Hills to the west and the Mississippi River Hills and Bluffs to the east and northeast.

It is located across the Mississippi River from Illinois.

Adjacent counties

Randolph County, Illinois (north)
Jackson County, Illinois (northeast)
Union County, Illinois (east)
Cape Girardeau County (southeast)
Bollinger County (southwest)
Madison County (southwest)
St. Francois County (northwest)
Ste. Genevieve County (northwest)

Major highways
 Interstate 55
 U.S. Route 61
 Route 51

National protected area
Middle Mississippi River National Wildlife Refuge (part)

Demographics

As of the census of 2000, there were 18,132 people, 6,904 households, and 4,957 families residing in the county. The population density was 38 people per square mile (15/km2). There were 7,815 housing units at an average density of 16 per square mile (6/km2). The racial makeup of the county was 98.21% White, 0.18% Black or African American, 0.23% Native American, 0.65% Asian, 0.03% Pacific Islander, 0.12% from other races, and 0.58% from two or more races. Approximately 0.51% of the population were Hispanic or Latino of any race.

There were 6,904 households, out of which 34.20% had children under the age of 18 living with them, 60.50% were married couples living together, 7.90% had a female householder with no husband present, and 28.20% were non-families. 24.50% of all households were made up of individuals, and 11.60% had someone living alone who was 65 years of age or older. The average household size was 2.57 and the average family size was 3.07.

In the county, the population was spread out, with 26.00% under the age of 18, 8.60% from 18 to 24, 27.90% from 25 to 44, 21.90% from 45 to 64, and 15.70% who were 65 years of age or older. The median age was 37 years. For every 100 females there were 99.20 males. For every 100 females age 18 and over, there were 97.50 males.

The median income for a household in the county was $44,264, and the median income for a family was $53,034. Males had a median income of $28,337 versus $19,720 for females. The per capita income for the county was $20,066. About 5.20% of families and 9.00% of the population were below the poverty line, including 8.90% of those under age 18 and 13.20% of those age 65 or over.

Religion
Unlike many rural counties in southeastern Missouri, Perry County is an exception to the Bible Belt, with Roman Catholicism being the majority religion, according to the Association of Religion Data Archives County Membership Report (2000). Among residents in Perry County who adhere to a religion, 60.33% are Roman Catholics, 29.72% are Lutherans, and 4.94% are Southern Baptists.

Perry County has the second highest percentage of Catholics of any county in the state of Missouri behind only Osage County, Missouri.  Perry County also has the second highest percentage of Lutherans of any county in the state of Missouri behind only Atchison County, Missouri.

2020 Census

Politics

Local
The Republican Party predominantly controls politics at the local level in Perry County. Republicans hold all of the elected positions in the county.

State
Perry County is divided into two districts in the Missouri House of Representatives, both of which are held by Republicans.

District 116 - Currently represented by Dale Wright (politician) (R-Farmington) and includes North of the city of Perryville as well as some area east and west of the city. Wright has represented the district since 2018.

District 145 - Currently represented by Rick Francis (R-Perryville, Missouri) and includes the rest of Perry County (Altenburg, Biehle, Frohna, Longtown).

All of Perry County is a part of Missouri's 27th District in the Missouri Senate and is currently represented by State Senator Holly Rehder (R-Scott City). The 27th Senatorial District consists of Bollinger, Cape Girardeau, Madison, Mississippi, Perry, and Scott counties.

Federal
Perry County is included in Missouri's 8th Congressional District and is currently represented by Jason T. Smith (R-Salem) in the U.S. House of Representatives. Smith won a special election on Tuesday, June 4, 2013, to finish out the remaining term of U.S. Representative Jo Ann Emerson (R-Cape Girardeau). Emerson announced her resignation a month after being reelected with over 70 percent of the vote in the district. She resigned to become CEO of the National Rural Electric Cooperative.

Political culture

At the presidential level, Perry County is a reliably Republican stronghold. John McCain easily carried the county over Barack Obama in 2008, and George W. Bush carried Perry County by even stronger margins in 2000 and 2004. The last Democratic presidential nominee to win Perry County was Lyndon B. Johnson in the landslide Election of 1964.

Like most rural areas, voters in Perry County generally adhere to socially and culturally conservative principles which strongly influence their Republican leanings. In 2004, Missourians voted on a constitutional amendment to define marriage as the union between a man and a woman—it overwhelmingly passed Perry County with 85.07 percent of the vote. The initiative passed the state with 71 percent of support from voters as Missouri became the first state to ban same-sex marriage. In 2006, Missourians voted on a constitutional amendment to fund and legalize embryonic stem cell research in the state—it failed in Perry County with 69.45 percent voting against the measure. The initiative narrowly passed the state with 51 percent of support from voters as Missouri became one of the first states in the nation to approve embryonic stem cell research. Despite Perry County's longstanding tradition of supporting socially conservative platforms, voters in the county have a penchant for advancing populist causes like increasing the minimum wage. In 2006, Missourians voted on a proposition (Proposition B) to increase the minimum wage in the state to $6.50 an hour—it passed Perry County with 69.52 percent of the vote. The proposition strongly passed every single county in Missouri with 75.94 percent voting in favor as the minimum wage was increased to $6.50 an hour in the state. During the same election, voters in five other states also strongly approved increases in the minimum wage.

Missouri presidential preference primary (2008)

Unlike many of the rural areas in Missouri that backed former Governor Mike Huckabee (R-Arkansas), Perry County provided U.S. Senator John McCain (R-Arizona) with his third strongest showing in Missouri. However, former U.S. Senator Hillary Clinton (D-New York) received more votes, a total of 1,180, than any candidate from either party in Perry County during the 2008 presidential primary.

Education
Of adults 25 years of age and older in Perry County, 71.2% possesses a high school diploma while 9.9% holds a bachelor's degree or higher as their highest educational attainment.

Public schools
Altenburg 48 Elementary School - Altenburg - (K-08)
Perry County School District No. 32 - Perryville
Perryville Early Childhood Special Education Center (PK)
Perryville Elementary School (K-04)
Perry County Middle School (05-08)
Perryville High School (09-12)
Perryville Area Career & Technology Center (09-12)

Private schools
United in Christ Lutheran School - Frohna - (PK-8) - Lutheran Church–Missouri Synod
Immanuel Lutheran School, Perryville - (PK-8) - Lutheran Church–Missouri Synod
St. Vincent De Paul Schools, Perryville - (PK-12) - Roman Catholic
St. Vincent De Paul Elementary School (PK-6)
St. Vincent De Paul High School (7-12)

Public libraries
 Altenburg Branch Library
 Perryville Branch Library

Tourism & attractions
Perry County offers a number of historic, architectural and scenic attractions.

Visitors can explore the grounds of the St. Mary's of the Barrens Seminary, the first college founded west of the Mississippi River dating back to 1827. Other features include the National Shrine of our Lady of the Miraculous Medal, the Rosati Log Cabin, the Countess Estelle Doheny Museum with its priceless Gospel of St. John from the Gutenberg Bible and the Bishop Edward Sheehan Memorial Museum and Rare Book Room. Guided tours of the museums are available by request.

In Perryville, the county seat, visitors can stroll the beautiful square surrounding the Perry County Courthouse built in 1904 with its chiming clock tower. The Square is considered a show place of the city with newly completed streets, decorative sidewalks, "Washington" style light fixtures and decorative tree plantings. Newly brick-paved plaza, landscaped seating areas, park benches, a sundial, a drinking fountain, a directional marker and a gazebo have been added to the courthouse lawn.

On the northeastern corner of the square sits the Levi Block building constructed around 1829, which is thought to be the oldest remaining commercial building in Perryville. It now houses Hilderbrand Jewelers.

The Faherty House, located at 11 S. Spring Street, was originally constructed by Henry Burns in 1825 as a two-room stone house with a basement. It is thought to be the oldest remaining residence in the city. A brick, two-room addition to the house was built in the 1850s. The house also stands on one of the original town lots of Perryville. The restored house features a circa 1830-1890 exterior and interior and is owned and maintained by the Perry County Historical Society.

The Perry County Museum is located at the entrance of the Perryville City Park in the Doerr House, (Wednesday and weekends, May–October).

In southeastern Perry County near the Mississippi River are the early German villages of Frohna, Altenburg, and Wittenberg.

The Saxon Lutheran Memorial in Frohna is dedicated to the preservation of the religious and cultural heritage of the 1839 Saxon Immigration to Missouri (daily, year-round). The memorial boasts two original log houses, a large log barn, a collection of tools and antique farm machinery, a visitor's center, country store and gift shop.

In Altenburg, visit the Concordia Log Cabin College (1839), the Loeber Log Cabin (1839) and Trinity Lutheran Church (1867). The log cabin college was the first Lutheran Seminary west of the Mississippi River. Guided tours of historic Altenburg are also available by appointment.

Traveling south, visit the Tower Rock Natural Area, a designated national landmark, which features a  hiking trail. The history of Tower Rock dates to 1698, when three missionaries established a landing atop the rocky island. Nearby, the early 19th century settlement of Apple Creek features the Lady of St. Joseph Shrine.

Perry County has approximately 650 known caves. It has more caves than any other county in Missouri, which is nicknamed "The Cave State."

Communities

Cities
Altenburg
Frohna
Perryville (county seat)

Village
Longtown

Census-designated places
Biehle
Brewer
Lithium
Shakertowne

Unincorporated communities

Allen's Landing
Apple Creek
Barks
Belgique
Brazeau
Brewer
Claryville
Corners
Crosstown
Eureka
Farrar
Fenwick Settlement
Friedenberg
Highland
McBride
Menfro
Millheim
Old Appleton
Pointrest
Schalls
Schumer Springs
Sereno
Seventy-Six
Silver Lake
Uniontown
Wittenberg
Yount

Former communities

 Dresden
 Fenwick Settlement
 Friendlytown
 Giboney
 Le Grand Village Sauvage
 Pointrest
 Seelitz
 Seventy-Six
 Starlanding
 Tucker's Settlement

Townships

Bois Brule
Brazeau
Central
Cinque Hommes
St. Mary's
Salem
Saline
Union

Islands

 Grand Tower Island

See also
National Register of Historic Places listings in Perry County, Missouri

References

External links

Official Perry County, Missouri Website
Early History of Perry County
St. Mary's of the Barrens
 Graebner, August Lawrence. Half a Century of Sound Lutheranism in America: A Brief Sketch of the History of the Missouri Synod. St. Louis: Concordia Publishing House, 1893. (describes how settlers in Perry County founded the Missouri Synod)
 Digitized 1930 Plat Book of Perry County  from University of Missouri Division of Special Collections, Archives, and Rare Books

 
1820 establishments in Missouri Territory
Populated places established in 1820
Missouri counties on the Mississippi River